Nandrolone undecanoate (NU), also known as nandrolone undecylate, and sold under the brand names Dynabolon, Dynabolin, and Psychobolan, is an androgen and anabolic steroid medication and a nandrolone ester. It was developed in the 1960s, and was previously marketed in France, Germany, Italy, and Monaco, but has since been discontinued and is now no longer known to be available. The pharmacokinetics of nandrolone undecanoate alone (Dynabolon) and in combination with other steroid esters (Trophobolene) have been studied and compared.

See also
 List of androgen esters § Nandrolone esters
 Estrapronicate/hydroxyprogesterone heptanoate/nandrolone undecanoate

References

Abandoned drugs
Androgens and anabolic steroids
Nandrolone esters
Progestogens
Undecanoate esters